Jeannie (also known as Girl in Distress) is a 1941 British romantic comedy film directed by Harold French and starring Barbara Mullen, Michael Redgrave, and Albert Lieven.

The film's sets were designed by Duncan Sutherland.

Based on a play of the same name by Aimée Stuart, it was loosely remade in 1957 as Let's Be Happy.

Plot
Jeannie McLean is a young Scottish woman who takes care of her tightfisted father, leaving her no time (and money) for herself. When he dies, she discovers he has left his "fortune" – 297 pounds – to her, nothing to her married sisters. She decides to have some fun for a change, starting with a trip to Vienna.

On the way to and in Vienna, a stranger, Stanley Smith, helps her through various difficulties resulting from her inexperience. As they become acquainted, she tells him she is 26, but he soon discovers (from her passport) that she is 22.

In Vienna, Jeannie makes the acquaintance of Count Ehrlich von Wittgenstein, while Stanley gets to know a blonde model named Margaret. The next day, Stanley sets out to market his invention, a washing machine, while the count takes Jeannie on a tour of the city. She goes shopping for clothes. When Stanley sees her that night, she is completely transformed outwardly. Stanley asks her out, but she is already engaged to go to the opera with the count. Stanley takes Margaret there too. Everywhere the count takes Jeannie, Stanley arranges to be there as well, along with Margaret. Finally, the count asks Jeannie to marry him, but when he learns that she is not rich as he thought, he breaks it off. Jeannie has just money enough left to get home.

Stanley has great success selling his washing machines, but when he goes to Scotland to find Jeannie, no one knows where she is. As luck would have it, she has found work demonstrating Stanley's product. He proposes to her, and after some resistance, she gives in.

Cast

 Barbara Mullen as Jeannie McLean
 Michael Redgrave as Stanley Smith  
 Wilfrid Lawson as James McLean, her father 
 Kay Hammond as Margaret  
 Albert Lieven as Count Ehrlich von Wittgenstein
 Phyllis Stanley as Mrs. Whitelaw
 Edward Chapman as Mr. Jansen
 Marjorie Fielding as Mrs. Murdoch
 Frank Cellier
 Googie Withers as Laundry Girl 
 Gus McNaughton as Angus Whitelaw  
 Rachel Kempson as Jeannie's sister
 Esme Percy
 Joan Kemp-Welch as Jeannie's sister
 Percy Walsh as French Customs Official  
 Hilda Bayley as Mrs. Jansen  
 Ian Fleming 
 Anne Shelton
 Meinhart Maur
 Katie Johnson as Mathilda  
 Joss Ambler
 Wally Patch as Porter  
 Brefni O'Rorke as Quarantine Officer
 Max Adrian 
 Phillip Godfrey as Restaurant Car Attendant 
 Lynn Evans

Production
The film established Harold French as a director. He later said:
The producer, Marcel Hellman, was very generous to me and he forced me through into a major picture; I don’t think the distributors wanted me, they wanted someone well known. It made a star of Barbara Mullen, who was terribly good, though we thought she would have become a bigger star. Bernard Knowles was the cameraman; I valued his co-operation. If I got in a muddle in a crowd scene, he always knew how to move the camera. We also had Anatole de Grunwald and Roland Pertwee as the writers so we had a very well credentialed film... Jeannie was a success because Jeannie was Cinderella.

Critical reception
The New York Times wrote, "Every now and then, thank heaven, there comes to Broadway a modest and unsung little film that arouses no anticipations at all and then quietly and firmly captivates you. "Jeannie," now at the Little Carnegie, is just such a film, and this corner, at least, accepts it with pleasure as that theatre's first offering of the season...For "Jeannie"...is as enchanting a bit of rue and nonsense as we've succumbed to in many a month..."Jeannie" is pure comedy of character. And what refreshing comedy it is!...Director Harold French...has staged the story with affection and understanding, "Jeannie" is not super-duper entertainment to knock your eye out, but it does have the gleam of real gold. As Jeannie likes to say: "My, how nice!" and Leonard Maltin similarly approved of an "Enjoyable comedy-romance," and rated the film three out of four stars.

References

External links

 

1941 films
1941 romantic comedy films
British black-and-white films
British romantic comedy films
1940s English-language films
British films based on plays
Films directed by Harold French
Films with screenplays by Anatole de Grunwald
Films set in Scotland
Films set in France
Films set in London
Films set in Vienna
1940s British films